Saint-Martin-lès-Langres (literally Saint-Martin near Langres) is a commune in the Haute-Marne department in north-eastern France. The musicologist Jean Étienne Feytou (1742–1816) was born in Saint-Martin-lès-Langres.

See also
Communes of the Haute-Marne department

References

Saintmartinleslangres